Saimoh is a village in Pulwama district, Jammu and Kashmir, India. It is situated in Tral town.  Both Muslims and Sikhs reside in the village. It has many mohallas.  It is situated on an edge of a mountain.

Villages in Pulwama district